The following is a list of international presidential trips made by Salome Zourabichvili since she became the 5th President of Georgia on 16 December  2018.

2019

2020

2021

External links
Official Site of the President of Georgia

References

Presidential trips made by Salome Zourabichvili
Presidential trips made by Salome Zourabichvili
Zourabichvili, Salome
Zourabichvili, Salome